Royal Air Force Syerston, commonly known as merely RAF Syerston , is a Royal Air Force station in the parish of Flintham, near Newark, Nottinghamshire, England.  Opened in 1940, it was used by the Royal Air Force (RAF) as a bomber base during the Second World War, operating Vickers Wellingtons, Avro Manchesters, and the Avro Lancaster heavy bombers. Post-war, it became home to Jet Provosts of the 2 Flying Training School.  It is now home to the Royal Air Force Central Gliding School.

History

Bomber Command

RAF Syerston was built as part of the bomber expansion in the late 1930s, but did not open until 1 December 1940.  The first aircraft were Vickers Wellingtons crewed by Polish flyers who had joined the RAF.  In July 1941, they were replaced by members of the Royal Canadian Air Force (RCAF), flying Handley-Page Hampdens.  From December 1941 until 5 May 1942, the base was closed whilst a concrete runway was built with two T2 hangars.  When it re-opened, it became part of No. 5 Group.  In 1942, several squadrons of Avro Lancaster aircraft arrived. No. 61 Conversion Flight between May and August 1942 with Manchester's and Lancaster's and No. 408 Conversion Flight between May and June 1942 used the airfield supporting their respective squadrons. The airfield was used as a Relief Landing Ground for No. 16 (Polish) SFTS during Winter 1942/43

In March 1943, Wing Commander Guy Gibson was commanding officer of 106 Sqn at Syerston, before he was given the task of forming 617 Sqn – The Dambusters, at RAF Coningsby. 

On 3/4 November 1943, Bill Reid of 61 Squadron was awarded a Victoria Cross on a mission flown from Syerston.

On 17 November 1943, the operational squadrons departed, and the station was used for bomber crew training, led by Captain Robert White. No. 1668 Heavy Conversion Unit joined on 17 November 1943 and became No. 5 Lancaster Finishing School four days later. No. 1485 (Bombing) Gunnery Flight between November 1943 and February 1944. From November 1943 to July 1944, there was also No. 1690 (Bomber) Defence Training Flight in attendance with several Wellingtons, Spitfires, Hurricanes, plus a few Martinet tug aircraft; all employed in brushing up the skills of air gunners on air-to-air exercises.  The LFS left on 1 April 1945, with No. 49 Squadron arriving from RAF Fulbeck later in the month who only had one operation before leaving to RAF Mepal in September. Bomber Command Film Flight Unit between April and October 1945 used the airfield.

Post-war use

On 25 October 1945, the station became part of Transport Command with No. 1668 Heavy Conversion Unit RAF arriving from RAF Leicester East, which stayed until 5 January 1948 when it moved to RAF Dishforth.  No. 1331 Heavy Transport Conversion Unit reformed here on 15 December 1946 with the Halifax A.7,  the unit was disbanded on 5 January 1948. No. 1333 (Transport Support) Conversion Unit arrived October 1945, absorbing No. 1385 Heavy Transport Conversion Unit during July 1946, became No. 1333 Transport Support Training Unit during July 1946 then moved to North Luffenham during January 1948.

Syerston was taken over by Flying Training Command on 1 February 1948, when  No. 22 Service Flying Training School (22 SFTS) arrived from RAF Ouston, the unit was renamed to No. 22 FTS one day later, the unit trained pilots for the Fleet Air Arm (FAA).  Other nearby RAF airfields used for flying circuits were RAF Newton (February 1948 - November 1951) and RAF Tollerton (November 1951 - May 1955). The training school became No. 1 Flying Training School (1 FTS) on 1 May 1955. In November 1953, Percival Provosts began being used, being replaced by the (Hunting Percival) Jet Provost in 1959. The flying training school was disbanded on 16 January 1970 when the need for pilots had diminished, and the station lay vacant.  Syerston was placed under care and maintenance from 1971 and used as a Relief Landing Ground for RAF College during 1972.

Role and operations

643 VGS joined in October 1992, followed by No. 645 VGS from April 1998 until 2005. Most of the original station buildings were demolished in 1997 except for two hangars, the air traffic control tower, and one H-block.

In January 2014, the Central Gliding School (CGS) and No. 644 Volunteer Gliding Squadron have been based at Syerston.

2014 saw the reformation of No. 2 Flying Training School (2 FTS) at Syerston, along with a permanent home for Headquarters No. 2 Flying Training School (HQ 2 FTS), the Royal Air Force Central Gliding School (RAF CGS), and No. 644 Volunteer Gliding Squadron (644 VGS).

Based units

Notable units based at RAF Syerston.

No. 22 Group (Training) RAF (22 Grp)
No. 2 Flying Training School (2 FTS)
Headquarters No. 2 Flying Training School (HQ 1 FTS)
Central Gliding School (CGS) – Grob Viking T1
No. 644 Volunteer Gliding Squadron (644 VGS) – Grob Viking T1

Parented units
Royal Air Force Syerston is parent to four satellite airfields, namely RAF Kenley, RAF Kirknewton, RAF Topcliffe, and RAF Little Rissington.

Historical units
No. 49 Squadron RAF (22 April 1945 – 28 September 1945) — Avro Lancaster I & III
No. 61 Squadron RAF (5 May 1942 – 17 November 1943) — Avro Lancaster I, II & III
No. 106 Squadron RAF (1 October 1942 – 17 November 1943) — Avro Lancaster I & III
No. 304 (Polish) Squadron RAF (December 1940 – 20 July 1941) — Vickers Wellington IC
No. 305 (Polish) Squadron RAF (December 1940 – 20 July 1941) — Vickers Wellington IC
No. 408 Squadron RCAF (July 1941 – 8 December 1941) — Handley Page Hampden
No. 504 (County of Nottingham) Squadron RAuxAF (May 1946 – April 1947) — de Havilland Mosquito
 Four Counties Gliding Club
 Loughborough Students Union Gliding Club
 Nottingham Air Touring Group
 RAF Syerston Flying Club
 No. 27 Heavy Glider Maintenance Section
 No. 2727 Squadron RAF Regiment

Incidents

On 20 September 1958, the prototype Avro Vulcan VX770 crashed during a fly past at RAF Syerston Battle of Britain At Home display. A Rolls-Royce test pilot was authorised to fly VX770 on an engine performance sortie with a fly past at the Battle of Britain display. The Vulcan flew along the main 07/25 runway (now 06/24 due to magnetic shift), then started a roll to starboard and climbed slightly. Very shortly after, a kink appeared in the starboard mainplane leading edge, followed by a stripping of the leading edge of the wing. The starboard wingtip then broke, followed by a collapse of the main spar and wing structure. Subsequently, the Vulcan went into a dive, and began rolling with the starboard wing on fire, and struck the ground at the taxiway end of runway 07. Three occupants of a controllers' caravan were killed by debris, a fourth being injured. All the crew of the Vulcan were killed. Proposed causes of the accident have included pilot error, fatigue failure, and inadequate maintenance.

See also
List of Royal Air Force stations
Air Training Corps

References

Sources

External links

RAF Syerston — official website at www.RAF.MoD.uk
No. 644 Volunteer Gliding Squadron
UK Military Aeronautical Information Publication – Syerston (EGXY)

Royal Air Force stations in Nottinghamshire
Airports in England